Evie Ferris (born 18 February 1997) is an Australian ballerina and member of children's band The Wiggles.

Ferris was born in Cairns, Australia, and attended St Andrews Catholic College until year 7. She began dance and performing arts classes at the age of four. By 2007 she had a supporting role in The Australian Ballet's production of Don Quixote. Ferris was one of eight dancers to earn a role after auditioning with 150 other young dancers, and she was a puppet in the story in the Man of La Mancha. In 2010, at the age of twelve, she moved to Melbourne to join the Australian Ballet School. She toured with the school's Dancer's Company in 2014 and 2015 and undertook a student exchange to Canada in 2015. In 2015 she was selected to join The Australian Ballet, where she was the second indigenous ballerina after Ella Havelka.

In 2021, Ferris was selected to join The Wiggles as an auxiliary member as part of its expanded line-up. She appeared as the second blue Wiggle originally but has changed to be the second yellow Wiggle. As a Taribelang and Djiabugay woman, she is the first Indigenous Australian to be a member of the group.

References

External links

Australian ballerinas
The Wiggles members
Living people
1997 births
Indigenous Australian dancers
People from Cairns